The apse or apsis or apside (plural: apses or apsides) are architectural features of churches

Apse or apsis or apses or apsides or apside or variation, may also refer to:

 Apsis (or apse or apside), the nearest or farthest points of an spatial orbit
 Apse chapel (or apsis chapel or apside chapel or apsidal chapel; also known as the apse or apsis or apside), a part of a church that uses the apse architectural feature
 Apse (band), a U.S. rock band
 APSE, the Ada Programming Support Environment
 Apse Heath, Isle of Wight, UK
 Apse Manor, Isle of Wight, UK; a manor house
 Aina Apse (1926–2015), New Zealand potter

See also

 
 
 
 
 
 
 
 
 
 
 APS (disambiguation)
 Apsey (disambiguation)